Núria Mendoza Miralles (born 15 December 1995) is a Spanish footballer who plays as a defender for Levante.

Club career
Mendoza started her career at Espanyol B. In July 2021, Mendoza transferred to Levante having spent six seasons at Real Sociedad.

References

External links
Profile at La Liga

1995 births
Living people
Women's association football defenders
Spanish women's footballers
Footballers from Barcelona
Sportswomen from Catalonia
RCD Espanyol Femenino players
Real Sociedad (women) players
Levante UD Femenino players
Primera División (women) players